Thazi is a town in Thazi Township, Meiktila District, Mandalay Region, central Burma (Myanmar).

External links
Satellite map at Maplandia.com

Populated places in Mandalay Region
Township capitals of Myanmar